Noemie Says Yes is a Canadian drama film, directed by Geneviève Albert and released in 2022. The film stars Kelly Depeault as Noémie, a teenage girl who gets drawn into prostitution after running away from a youth centre.

The cast also includes James-Edward Métayer, Geneviève Alarie, Sylvio Archambault, Megane Ayan, Badr Bahsis, Véronique Beaudet, Thara Hillary Benjamin, Myriam De Bonville, Anthony Bouchard, Alice Boucher, Diana Bérubé, Carole Chatel, Emi Chicoine, Rose Choinière, Dominique Denis, Sébastien Dodge, Sylvain Dupuis, Maxime Gibault and Jérémie Earp.

The film opened in theatres on April 29, 2022. The provincial film review board restricted the film to viewers 16 years of age and older, a decision which Albert criticized on the grounds that it was important to educate young girls about the dangers of prostitution.

Awards
The film was screened at the Angoulême Film Festival, where it won the Valois student film award and Depeault received a special jury mention for her performance.

The film received two Canadian Screen Award nominations at the 11th Canadian Screen Awards in 2023, for Best Lead Performance in a Film (Depeault) and the John Dunning Best First Feature Award.

References

External links
 

2022 films
2022 drama films
French-language Canadian films
Canadian drama films
2020s Canadian films
Films shot in Quebec
Films set in Quebec
Films about prostitution in Canada